Gardner Airport may refer to:

Public use airports:
 Gardner Municipal Airport (Kansas) in Gardner, Kansas, United States (FAA: K34)
 Gardner Municipal Airport (Massachusetts) in Gardner, Massachusetts, United States (FAA: GDM)

Private use airports
 Gardner Airport (Florida), in Gardner, Florida, United States (FAA: FD40)
 Gardner Airport (Pennsylvania), in Breinigsville, Pennsylvania, United States (FAA: 29PA)

Former airports
 Gardner Army Airfield, a former U.S. Army Airfield in Taft, California, United States

Similarly named airports
 Gardiner Airport